Lamaureriella is a genus of laterally-flattened curled helcionellid known from Lower Ordovician deposits.  The majority of the hundreds of known specimens come from a single concretion.  The specimens are on the scale of millimetres; they bear unusual flanges ("plications") on their sides.

References

Helcionelloida